Skelmersdale United Football Club is a football club from Skelmersdale, Lancashire. The club is a member of both the Liverpool F.A. and the Lancashire County Football Association.

History

The first 75 years
The club had its genesis in a team of players brought together by the teachers of the Skelmersdale Wesleyan Day School and it was called Skelmersdale Young Rovers, the headmaster at the time being Mr Ritson. When he left he was succeeded by Mr Forster of St Helens, a real football enthusiast. Under his guidance the team became a much stronger organisation and the name was changed to Skelmersdale Wesleyans, subsequently the minister expressed his disapproval of this and the team became Skelmersdale United.
Nearly 10 years after their formation United joined the newly created Lancashire Combination in 1891-92 Skelmersdale was a small mining community with a population of a little over 5,000 and they were paired up with the reserve sides of clubs that were in the top flight of English football, Blackburn Rovers, Bolton Wanderers and Preston North End.
The club won its first major trophy in 1908 when they defeated Portsmouth Rovers in the final of the Lancashire Junior Shield.
They joined the Liverpool County Combination in 1909 and won the first of their Championship titles in 1911 they competed in the League until 1955, during which time they were Champions on 10 occasions, Liverpool County FA Challenge Cup Winners on 8 occasions and George Mahan Cup Winners 5 times.  For the majority of their first seventy years the club played at Sandy Lane that is now the site of an office block. 
Tom Tinsley who played for just four seasons (either side of the war) created a record by scoring 214 goals this despite many games missed due to Army call ups.

For the 1955-56 season the club moved into the 2nd Division of the Lancashire Combination, and in their 1st season they lifted the Championship. and also found a new home White Moss Park.

A new team for a new town
Skelmersdale became a designated new town in 1961 and ushered in a whole new era for the area. Coincidentally, around the same time, in August 1961, Wesley Bridge was made Secretary/Manager of United and began the radical restructuring the club. In 1966–67 the changes began to pay dividends on the pitch. The FA Amateur Cup quarter final victory against Slough Town was a record gate for Whitemoss Park (Sandy Lane) – 7,500 – in March 1967. That year United won their way to the FA Amateur Cup Final at Wembley in front of 75,000 spectators (which, at the time, was the biggest Wembley attendance for any game other than an FA Cup Final, League Cup or International game). A 0-0 draw with Enfield resulted in a replay at Maine Road, Manchester. Whilst United lost 3–0, the whole experience was the basis of an extraordinarily successful period in their history. The following season United lost away to Football League club Scunthorpe United in the first round proper of the FA Cup. In 1968–69 United again qualified for the FA Cup first round only to lose away to Football League club Chesterfield. The same season, after transferring from the down-graded Lancs Combination to the Cheshire County League, United won the league championship, a feat they would repeat the following year. The club also got through to the semi finals of the FA Amateur Cup, another feat that they would repeat the next year. In 1970–71 United won the FA Amateur Cup in a 4–1 thrashing of Dagenham at Wembley. Despite only finishing third in the Cheshire County League, United also secured promotion to the Northern Premier League, the highest level the club had ever played at. In 1971–72, United finished in the top half of the Northern Premier League, and qualified again for the first round proper of the FA Cup where they were beaten at home by football league club Tranmere Rovers.

Decline and revival
By 1976 United had dropped into the Lancashire Combination. In 1982, when the Combination was amalgamated with the Cheshire County League to form the North West Counties League (NWCL), United found themselves in Division Two of the NWCL. The club reached the inaugural League Challenge Cup Final, only losing in a replay to Darwen. In 1987 the NWCL was restructured when a large number of clubs left to join the Northern Premier. This restructuring saw the club move up to the NWCL First Division. United struggled for three seasons before being relegated.

Russ Perkins was named as Manager and the club quickly regained promotion and the start of the long road back to the club's former glories. Winning the League Challenge Trophy in May 2000, the club left their spiritual home of White Moss Park in 2002 and eventually moved to the newly named Westgate Interactive Stadium (also known as Stormy Corner) in 2004. Stuart Rudd smashed the goalscoring record netting 230 goals. With Paul Gallagher in charge the club moved forward securing a second-place finish and promotion to the Northern Premier League in 2006.

Northern Premier league
United appointed the experienced manager Tommy Lawson to take the club to the new level and apart from a mid-table position in 06-07 the club finished in a play-off position all but once in the next 5 seasons. In 2008, Skelmersdale United finished third in the inaugural season of the Northern Premier League Division One North. They were only 4 points off the top spot and won the semi-final of the playoffs against Curzon Ashton 3-1. The final was against FC United. Despite scoring first in front of 4000 fans at Bury FC’s ground, they lost 4-1. The 2009 season saw Skelmersdale finish 2nd by 1 point and lose in the semi-finals of the playoffs to Newcastle Blue Star 1-0. Both teams that were promoted that season went into administration in the off-season. The 2010 season saw Skem finish in 5th place and lose in the semi-final of the playoffs 2-0 to Lancaster City.

In the 2011 season Skelmersdale again finished in 2nd place to Chester. Skem were 3 points behind and had a worse goal difference, but having scored significantly more goals than Chester.  The final day of fixtures saw Skem needing to win and for Chester to lose, with an 8 goal swing in Skem’s favour. Chester did in fact lose to mid-table Garforth Town by a 2-1 scoreline, but Skem only won their game 7-2 against bottom team Ossett Town, so missed out on promotion by 2 goals. Their misery was completed by losing in the semi finals yet again to AFC Fylde 1-0. The 2012 season saw Skem finish outside the playoffs for the first time in 7th place.

Skelmersdale continued to improve under manager Tommy Lawson. In the 2012-2013 season they finished top of the league, being promoted to the Northern Premier League Premier Division which sits under the Conference (now National League) and is level 7 in the National League system. They won it by a 16-point margin from second place, scoring 110 goals in the league alone that season. This is their highest position in non-league football 'pyramid' to date.(see the National League System).

On 5 March 2011, Skelmersdale entertained Chester in a Northern Premier League Division One North fixture and broke the attendance record for The Skelmersdale & Ormskirk College Stadium when 1,171 attended, it had previously been 1,002 for an FA Cup tie in 2004 against Burscough. Despite challenging for the title in their first season in the NPL Premier the club lost ground and eventually finished 6th. After a good start to the 2014-15 season, the club led the table until after the Christmas period but United found themselves in a serious financial problems and only by the efforts of the players, supporters and sponsors the club managed to see the season through. The season however ended on a high as victories over Champions FC United and a Liverpool Senior Cup win offered the club optimism for the future.

The 2015-16 season saw United finish 16th, the highlights of the season would come in the cup competitions, firstly the run to the FA Trophy first round where they exited at the hands of AFC Fylde. Losing 4-0 at the AJ Bell Stadium in January 2016 after weather had forced several postponements of United's hosting of the replay after drawing 4-4 in the original tie. The run included a stunning 5-2 win over Chorley FC in the previous round and United also reached the semi finals of the Liverpool Senior Cup where a 4-0 loss to eventual winners Everton U23 saw them end their defence of the trophy.

2016–17 was a season that will live long in the memories of United fans for the events of late March especially as they suffered relegation to Northern Premier League Division One North which was confirmed by a heavy 6-0 home defeat to Buxton FC on 25 March before on 28 March 2017, the club announced that it had been unable to agree a new lease on its Uretek Stadium ground and as a result was at risk of ceasing to exist.

However, on 1 April the club announced that an agreement had been reached with nearby Prescot Cables F.C. to ground share for the 2017/18 season, safeguarding the club's future in the short term.

Exits at the first stage of the cup competitions, coupled by an exodus of the playing staff over the festive period after a cut in the playing budget then led to a change in the backroom in January 2017 with long serving manager Tommy Lawson sacked, his assistants and a number of players exiting with him through loyalty, going on to re-unite later in the season at Marine AFC. Alan Rogers took charge in February and working with a very youthful squad, he was unable to prevent the drop to the division below but did so with a fighting spirit that saw United claim some good results against sides who would finish in the upper echelons of the table.

Ahead of their first season in Northern Premier League Division One North since 2013, United brought in a number of experienced players in pre-season, Danny Ventre, Richard Brodie, Andy Owens, Steven Gillespie and Gareth Roberts to bolster a young squad. A mixed start to the 2017-18 season saw one win in the opening nine league games with an exit in the First Qualifying round of the FA Cup. Alan Rogers departed as manager on 20 September citing other work commitments. Dave Powell was appointed manager on 24 September.

Under the early guide of Dave Powell, United sadly exited the FA Trophy, Integro League Cup and Liverpool Senior Cup at the hands of Mossley, Atherton Collieries and Burscough. A defeat to Kendal Town in the League was followed by a five-game unbeaten run which included a first away win of the season at Tadcaster Albion and home victories over Ramsbottom United, Mossley and Ossett Town. Their most recent wins came away from the Uretek Stadium though after the club were evicted on 20 October and after a generous offer from Marine, United played twice at the Marine Travel Arena before beginning their season-long ground-share at Prescot Cables' Valerie Park Park on 18 November.

A mixed opening to 2018 for the club saw United avoid relegation from the division with a 21st-place finish.

Relegation from Northern Premier League to current day

The following season in 2018–19 saw the club play in the newly formed Evo—Stik West division. One win in the opening 14 games saw a change in management with Dave Powell departing on 11 November, Paul McNally appointed as a manager on 16 November.

Having won only 13 points in their campaign, United were relegated from the Northern Premier League in 20th position to join the North West Counties Football League following a 5-0 loss to Prescot Cables who continued as landlords to United into the next season. Skelmersdale United moved to their new home of the JMO Sports Park after a mixed start to the 2019/20 North West Counties Football League season and played their first game at the venue on Boxing Day 2019 against local rivals Burscough with United coming out on top with a 4-0 win in front of 266 supporters. That was the first of a winning trilogy at JMO before a number of the high-flying sides visited with close run battles before the season was declared null and void by the FA due to the COVID-19 pandemic.

United reached the first round proper of the 2020–21 FA Cup for the first time since their 1971 loss to Tranmere and were beaten 4-1 by Harrogate Town. They began the competition in the extra preliminary round, beating six teams in order to reach the first round of the Cup.

In the 2021/22 season Skelmersdale United achieved promotion after finishing 2nd in the league to big spending Macclesfield and had to play a one off playoff game 150 miles away at Cinderford Town at Gloucester.
Michael Howard scoring 4 goals in a 5-1 win that saw Paul McNally's team promoted back to the NPL West and Michael Howard getting the golden boot as the divisions top scorer with 33 goals

Non-playing staff

Former players
Players who left the club directly for league clubs include:
 Micky Burns – Blackpool & Newcastle United (1971–76)
 Steve Heighway – Liverpool. The story that Steve gained an International Cap with the Republic of Ireland whilst he was still playing for Skelmersdale is a myth as Steve left United in April 1970 and gained his first cap 23 September 1970
 Matthew Dreha – Liverpool
 Sean McConville – Accrington Stanley January 2009
 Josh Lennie (2009)
 Matty Hughes – Fleetwood Town
 Ben Tollitt – Portsmouth

Those who played for the club and progressed into league football after leaving the club include:
 Paul Futcher – Chester City & Manchester City
 Ron Futcher – Chester City & Manchester City
 Craig Noone – Plymouth Argyle, Exeter City (Loan) and Brighton & Hove Albion
 Peter Withe – Nottingham Forest & Aston Villa
 Gerry Keenan – Port Vale

References

External links
Club website

 
Football clubs in England
Northern Premier League clubs
Sport in the Borough of West Lancashire
Association football clubs established in 1882
Lancashire Combination
1882 establishments in England
Football clubs in Lancashire
North West Counties Football League clubs
Liverpool County Football Combination
Cheshire County League clubs